Paul Graf Fugger or Paul Graf Fugger-Kirchberg-Weißenhorn (13 October 1637, Augsburg - 27 April 1701, Munich) was a German politician of the Fugger family. He was a Reichshofrat and a kurbayerischer Obersthofmeister. He was the fifteenth child of Otto Heinrich Fugger.

Family tree

1637 births
1701 deaths
German politicians
Paul